Góra Strękowa  is a village in the administrative district of Gmina Zawady, within Białystok County, Podlaskie Voivodeship, in north-eastern Poland. During World War II it formed the centre of the Polish positions during the Battle of Wizna.

The village has a population of 60.

References

Villages in Białystok County